Phaeostemma is a genus of flowering plants belonging to the family Apocynaceae.

Its native range is Northern South America, Southeastern and Southern Brazil to Northeastern Argentina.

Species:

Phaeostemma brasiliensis 
Phaeostemma fucata 
Phaeostemma glaziovii 
Phaeostemma hatschbachii 
Phaeostemma kelleri 
Phaeostemma riedelii 
Phaeostemma surinamensis

References

Apocynaceae
Apocynaceae genera